F. W. "Chip" Dobbs-Allsopp is a biblical scholar, epigrapher, and literary theorist. Currently professor of Old Testament, or Hebrew Bible, at Princeton Theological Seminary, he has taught and written extensively on Semitic languages, the origins of alphabetic writing, biblical poetry, poetics, and literary criticism.

Life
After earning a B.A. in history at Furman University, in 1984, Dobbs-Allsopp attended Princeton Theological Seminary, where he received an M.Div., in 1987. There, he was trained in Semitic philology and biblical interpretation by the notable specialists J.J.M. Roberts and Patrick D. Miller. He then pursued doctoral studies in Hebrew Bible and Northwest Semitic Philology at Johns Hopkins University, which he completed in 1992. At Yale University, Dobbs-Allsopp served as assistant professor of Semitics (1994–1999) and director of undergraduate studies (1995–97) before returning to Princeton as assistant (1999–2002), associate (2002–2014), and full (2015–present) professor of Old Testament. He has also acted as visiting assistant professor in Ugaritic at the University of Pennsylvania (2001–02).

Professional Activities
An expert in Semitic languages, Dobbs-Allsopp published, inter alia, perhaps the earliest alphabetic inscription, a Proto-Sinaitic text from Wadi el-Hol, with Egyptologist John C. Darnell. He also edited a major volume on Hebrew inscriptions with Roberts, Choon-Leong Seow, and Richard E. Whitaker (Yale University Press).

With respect to biblical scholarship, Dobbs-Allsopp has written two monographs on the book of Lamentations, in addition to any number of other essays in peer-reviewed journals and edited volumes. His most recent volume, On Biblical Poetry (Oxford University Press), has received early accolades from other prominent figures in the field of biblical studies. For Oxford Bibliographies, he co-edited the entry on Hebrew poetry. Finally, he is slated to edit the Megillot for The Hebrew Bible: A Critical Edition, formerly called the Oxford Hebrew Bible.

Dobbs-Allsopp has sat on numerous editorial boards: from the Society of Biblical Literature's Writings from the Ancient World and Walter de Gruyter's "Beiträge zur alttestamentlichen Wissenschaft" through the Journal of Biblical Literature and Maarav to the Princeton Classical Hebrew Lexicon Project as well as the Ugaritic Tablets Digital Edition Project. In addition, he has held membership to the American Oriental Society, American Schools of Oriental Research, the Society of Biblical Literature, the Columbia University Hebrew Bible Seminar, the Lenox House Colloquium, and the Oriental Club of New Haven.

Selected works

Books

Online resource

External links
Person Website at Princeton Theological Seminary
 CV of F.W. Dobbs-Allsopp

References

Living people
Date of birth missing (living people)
People from Princeton, New Jersey
Furman University alumni
Princeton Theological Seminary alumni
Johns Hopkins University alumni
Yale University faculty
University of Pennsylvania faculty
Semitic studies
American biblical scholars
Epigraphers
American literary theorists
21st-century American writers
Year of birth missing (living people)
Princeton Theological Seminary faculty